Lee Ridley (born 31 December 1980), better known by his stage name the Lost Voice Guy, is an English stand-up comedian. Disabled since early life, and unable to speak, he rose to prominence in June 2018 after winning the 12th series of Britain's Got Talent.

Early life
Ridley is originally from Consett, County Durham. At the age of six months he was diagnosed with a form of cerebral palsy, brought about by a brain infection that left him in a coma for two months, which affected his movement and rendered him unable to speak. His disability in early life made it difficult for him to communicate with people, until the age of eight, when he received his first communication device.

Ridley attended Percy Hedley School for disabled children, in Newcastle, until 12, then, until 16, the Barbara Priestman Academy for autistic children, and the mainstream school, Thornhill Academy, in Sunderland.

Between 1999 and 2002, he studied journalism and online journalism at the University of Central Lancashire, achieving an undergraduate degree in the former, and a master's degree in the latter.

Career
In 2006, he worked as a journalist with the BBC and local newspapers, before taking on the role of online content manager for the city of Sunderland in 2007.

In 2011, he worked as an online journalist for the Sunderland City Council media team and freelanced for dance and entertainment magazines and web sites.

Ridley began performing comedy in 2012. 

His decision to perform standup himself came in the aftermath of a show by Ross Noble, after which Ridley encountered the comedian and challenged him on the quality of Noble's impersonation of Stephen Hawking, claiming he could do a far better impersonation of the renowned physicist. To formulate his routines, Ridley purchased an iPad Text to Speech app called Speak It!, which he pre-programmed with sentences based on material he created. Following his first show, Ridley adapted his routine by selecting material that had received favourable audience reaction, and adopting a style of improvisation in which he occasionally created new material onstage through his synthesiser in real time. His first successful show was at the Edinburgh Festival Fringe in 2013, but he was forced to cut this short after he developed pneumonia.

In 2014, Ridley won the BBC Radio New Comedy Awards. 

In 2015, Ridley began to pursue a professional comedy career, performing a new show entitled Disability for Dunces as part of the Edinburgh Fringe that year. The following year, he performed a sequel of the show, entitled "Volume 2", and in 2017 he launched a new show entitled Inspiration Porn, which made fun of "inspirational" videos and memes about disability. 

By 2018, The Sequal Trust asked him to be a patron of their communication disability charity, a role he still plays.

In 2018, Ridley starred in Radio 4 sitcom Ability, which he co-wrote with the writer and comedian Katherine Jakeways (series 1 and 2) and Kat Butterfield and Daniel Audritt (series 3). His role involved playing the disabled 'Matt', who moves out from his parents' home to share with his best friend from school, who refreshingly treats him as an equal but is not the influence Matt's concerned parents are looking for. In June 2018, Ridley won the 12th series of Britain's Got Talent after successfully making it through the audition stages, and winning the show by the public vote. In February 2019, Ridley appeared in one episode of the BBC Three television series, Jerk.

In 2019, Ridley competed in America's Got Talent: The Champions, where he was eliminated in the preliminaries. He also released his first book I'm Only In It For The Parking.

The voice-synthesiser Ridley uses does not reflect what his accent would be if he was able to speak; to correct that, in March 2021 he announced he would be working with a technology company, CereProc and the voice-artist Dan Pye to create a Consett accent similar to his family's.

Awards and nominations

References

External links
Official site

Living people
British stand-up comedians
Alumni of the University of Central Lancashire
People with cerebral palsy
People with epilepsy
Mute people
People from Consett
People from Newcastle upon Tyne
Britain's Got Talent winners
1980 births